Subalpine warbler has been split into two species:
 Western subalpine warbler, Curruca iberiae
 Eastern subalpine warbler, Curruca cantillans

Birds by common name